Bated breath or with bated breath is a phrase meaning to hold one's breath in anticipation or trepidation. 

Bated breath, with bated breath, or other variants may refer to:

Music
 "Bated Breath", a song by singer-songwriter Tinashe on her 2014 debut studio album Aquarius
 "Bated Breath", a song by saxophonist Rob Brown on his 2000 album Visage
 "Bated Breath/In Sickness and Health", a 1981 single by post-punk band The Room

Other uses
 Bated Breath, a horse trained by Roger Charlton that won the 2012 Temple Stakes
 With Bated Breath, a drama by Bryden MacDonald that received the Lambda Literary Award for Drama in 2010
 With  Breath, a 2012 audio drama by George Mann that was written as a background novel for the Warhammer 40,000 video game series

See also
 Bate (disambiguation)
 Bait (disambiguation)
 The Merchant of Venice (circa 1597), Shakespeare play featuring the earliest known use of the phrase
 Eggcorn, idiosyncratic word substitutions such as baited breath for bated breath